Edward Ellice the Elder (27 September 1783 – 17 September 1863), known in his time as the "Bear", was a British merchant and politician. He was a Director of the Hudson's Bay Company and a prime mover behind the Reform Bill of 1832.

Biography
Ellice was born on 27 September 1783 in London, the son of Alexander Ellice and Ann Russell. In 1795, his father purchased the Seigneury of Villechauve from Michel Chartier de Lotbinière, Marquis de Lotbinière. His younger brother was General Robert Ellice.

He was educated at Winchester School and at Marischal College, Aberdeen. He became a partner in the firm of Phyn, Ellices and Inglis, which had become interested in the XY Company in Canada. He was sent to Canada in 1803, and in 1804 became a party to the union of the XY and North West Companies. He became a partner in the North West Company, and during the struggle with Lord Selkirk he played an important part.

He engaged in the Canada fur trade from 1803, and as a result was nicknamed "the Bear". On 30 October 1809 he married Hannah Althea Bettesworth, née Grey, daughter of Charles Grey, 1st Earl Grey, and the widow of Captain George Edmund Byron Bettesworth. He had one son by her, Edward.

In 1820, he was, with the brothers William and Simon McGillivray, active in bringing about the union of the North West and the Hudson's Bay Companies; and it was actually with him and the McGillivrays that the union was negotiated. He amalgamated the North West, XY, and Hudson's Bay companies in 1821.

In 1825 Ellice was a director of the New Zealand Company, a venture chaired by his brother-in-law, the wealthy John George Lambton, Whig MP (and later 1st Earl of Durham), that made the first attempt to colonise New Zealand. His brother Russell Ellice was also a director.

He was Member of Parliament for Coventry from 1818 to 1826, and again from 1830 to 1863. He served as a Secretary to the Treasury, and a whip in Lord Grey's government, 1830–1832. He was Secretary at War from 1832 to 1834, during which time he proposed that appointments in the army should be made directly from his office. He founded the Reform Club in 1836 and supported Palmerston as premier. He was appointed a Privy Counsellor in 1833.

He was awarded a DCL by St Andrews University. He privately urged French government to send troops into Spain in 1836. He was deputy-governor of the Hudson's Bay Company.

Ellice was a co-owner of eight sugar estates in Grenada, British Guiana, Tobago and Antigua. In the 1830s, the British government emancipated the slaves, and Ellice received compensation to the tune of about £35,000 for the liberation of over 300 slaves.

In 1843, he married, secondly, Anne Amelia Leicester, née Keppel, daughter of William Keppel, 4th Earl of Albemarle and widow of Thomas Coke, 1st Earl of Leicester. She died in the following year. His only son was Edward Ellice Jr., who also sat in Parliament.

Ellice was a serial host for notable visitors to Scotland including Sir Edwin Landseer, William Gladstone and Sir Henry Holland. In 1859 his son's wife, Katherine Ellice served as host when the artist Richard Doyle visited and she was given an illustrated diary of a journey to the islands of Rona and Skye. Katherine was an amateur artist and diarist.

His brother General Robert Ellice married Eliza Courtney; one of their grandsons became his son's heir in 1880.

Legacy
The Ellice Islands, formerly part of the colony of Gilbert and Ellice Islands and now the independent nation of Tuvalu, were named after him. The Rural Municipality of Ellice in Manitoba, Fort Ellice, and Ellice Avenue in Winnipeg are named after him.

See also

References

Bibliography
 
 
 
 
 

1783 births
1863 deaths
Alumni of the University of Aberdeen
Alumni of the University of St Andrews
Members of the Parliament of the United Kingdom for Coventry
Members of the Privy Council of the United Kingdom
UK MPs 1818–1820
UK MPs 1820–1826
UK MPs 1830–1831
UK MPs 1831–1832
UK MPs 1832–1835
UK MPs 1835–1837
UK MPs 1837–1841
UK MPs 1841–1847
UK MPs 1847–1852
UK MPs 1852–1857
UK MPs 1857–1859
UK MPs 1859–1865
Ellice family